This article contains brief biographies for characters from Terry Pratchett's Discworld series. This list consists of human characters. For biographies of noted members of the Discworld's "ethnic minorities" (dwarfs, trolls, undead, etc.), see the articles for those races. Some character biographies are also listed in articles relating to the organisations they belong to. For further Discworld character biographies, see the table below.

Characters are listed alphabetically by name.

71-Hour Ahmed

Adora Belle Dearheart
The daughter of Robert Dearheart, founder of the Grand Trunk Semaphore Company, Adora Belle Dearheart appears in Going Postal, Making Money and Raising Steam, she is a cynical, angry heavy smoker. Adora's family is conned out of the Grand Trunk by Reacher Gilt, forcing Adora to be employed at the Golem Trust. In Going Postal, Adora begins a tentative relationship with Moist von Lipwig; by the time of Making Money they have become engaged. Miss Dearheart can see through most of Lipwig's conman tricks, amazing him; he names her "Spike" out of fondness. Adora wears what she claims are "the pointiest heels in the world" which she uses to deal with unwelcome advances. In Raising Steam, Adora and Moist are married and living in Scoone Avenue, Ankh. Adora has returned to running the Clacks service – running it as her father did.

Bloody Stupid Johnson
Bergholdt Stuttley 'Bloody Stupid' Johnson is an inept engineer and landscape artist, famous the Disc over for a single-minded approach to his crafts that can best be described as 'demented'. Whereas Leonard of Quirm makes absent-minded brilliantly inventive doodles in the margins of his notebook, B.S. Johnson achieves the same effect through unforeseen side effects of devices invented for other purposes, and in the process creates some of the Disc's most impressive, dangerous, and unusual works of architecture, art, and engineering. Examples include the Johnson Exploding Pagoda and a chiming sundial that tends to explode every other day around noon. His most famous housing project, Empirical Crescent, tends to drive residents insane if they do not move out quickly or simply disappear.

At the outset of the Discworld series, B.S. Johnson is well remembered, but has long been deceased. His architecture and other inventions remain.

Brutha

Brutha was an Ommnian novice in Small Gods. Omnia is an autocratic theocracy that believes in one God named Om. Brutha is a faithful and dutiful lad, word perfect on Omnian religious texts on account of his eidetic memory but unable to read or write. He finds a tortoise in his melon patch which is actually the great God Om afflicted with temporary amnesia which rescinds in the presence of Brutha. Brutha is the only true believer of Om, as all other "believers" only go along with the state religion either out of fear of torture and death by the Quisition, or out of habit.

After the failed Omnian occupation of Ephebe and the mobilisation of the armed forces of all the other countries along the Klatchian coast against Omnia, Brutha resolves the conflict and becomes the Cenobiarch of Omnia, and the Eighth Prophet and Prophet of Prophets of Omnianism. Reforming the Church along tolerant, humanist lines, he reigns for a hundred years before dying.

Canting Crew
The 'Canting Crew' is an informal name for a group of Ankh-Morpork beggars who are too anarchic for the Beggars' Guild, which has a tendency to constrain them with rules. Members of the group can often be found beneath Ankh-Morpork's Misbegot Bridge and are normally accompanied by the talking dog Gaspode. Death joins the crew in Soul Music where he takes the name, Mr Scrub. Death is successful at taking coin and enhancing the group's earning power where he also becomes known as the Grateful Death.

Foul Ole Ron
Excessively seedy, momentously dirty, overpoweringly smelly and entirely incomprehensible, Foul Ole Ron is the best-known member of the crew. He owns the world's only Thinking Brain Dog (as opposed to a "Seeing-eye dog"), Gaspode. Ron's smell has become strong enough to not only melt earwax but to acquire a separate existence. In fact, it outclasses him, and is usually referred to in text as being almost another character entirely, who occasionally arrives ahead of Ron, opts to stick around for a while after his departure, and even goes to upper-class parties without him.

He is well known for his "catchphrase", "Buggrit, millennium hand an' shrimp...", which was the result of Pratchett feeding a random text generating program with a Chinese takeaway menu and the lyrics to They Might Be Giants' song Particle Man.

Another notable fact is that his catchphrase (minus "buggrit") is also used by Mrs Tachyon, a character in the Johnny Maxwell series, also by Pratchett. Foul Ole Ron is in one verse of Sam Vimes' 'City Version' of "Where's My Cow?". Young Sam enjoyed it, but Lady Sybil Vimes disapproved of this version.

Coffin Henry
Sometimes spelt 'Coughin' Henry'. He has a habitual cough, hence his name, the result of his continuous smoking habit, again, hence his name. His cough is described as sounding 'almost solid'.

Like Ron, he appears as a verse in Where's My Cow?, when Sam adapts the Book's basic structure to fit city life. In it, Henry goes "Cough, gack, ptui".

Unlike Ron, who asks people for money to stop him following them, Coffin Henry makes money by not going anywhere. People send him small sums so that he will not turn up at their parties and ask them to look at his interesting collection of skin diseases.

He also wears a sign saying "For sum muny I wont follo yu hom".

Altogether Andrews
Altogether Andrews is a mass of multiple personalities (none of them named Andrews) in one mind, many of which are of considerably higher social status than him; these include Jossi, Lady Hermione, Little Sidney, Mr Viddle, Curly, the Judge, and Tinker; the eighth personality is simply known as Burke, who was only seen once by the canting crew (though not in any narrative), and they had no desire to ever see him again.  The other seven personalities are very careful to keep him buried.

The Duck Man speculates that Andrews was once a mild-mannered person of a psychic disposition who was mentally overwhelmed by the other souls. He is generally regarded as one of the most consistently sane of the group, as at least five of his personalities are capable of holding a sensible conversation with other people. His personalities 'voted' to decide whether to act as street vendors of The Ankh Morpork Times (in The Truth) and Andrews held up five fingers to indicate the outcome of his personalities' decision.

The Duck Man
The Duck Man is regarded as the intellectual of the group, and appears to be relatively sane. He is apparently unaware of the fact that he has a duck on his head, and has little memory of his life previous to joining the Canting Crew, referring to it only as "when I was someone else". He appears to have been rich and well educated at some time in the past, and even as a beggar, his clothes are the tattered remnants of an expensive suit. As a boy, he "messed around in boats".  Somebody apparently wants him dead, as the price on his head at The Assassins' Guild is $132,000. Considering the fragile sanity of the Canting Crew, there's a chance he might have put that contract on himself before becoming a beggar.
The Duck Man appears in several of Pratchett's books, including Hogfather, Soul Music , The Truth, and Feet of Clay.

Arnold Sideways
A member noted for being completely legless. Literally; a cart ran over his legs several years ago and he now gets around on a wheelbarrow, usually pushed by the Duck Man. He carries an old boot on a stick, so muggers desperate enough to try to rob the beggars often find themselves being kicked on the top of the head by a man 3 feet tall.

Carcer
The villain of Night Watch, described by Vimes as "a stone-cold killer. With brains".

Carcer is said to have a talent for unnerving people, an annoying laugh (written as 'haha' in the book) and a perpetual conviction of his own innocence despite his many crimes, which include at least two murders.  He claims his original crime was stealing a loaf of bread (a nod to the protagonist of Les Misérables), though Vimes says that Carcer's style would be to murder the baker and steal the whole bakery.

Carcer's full name was shown in a preview of Night Watch to be Carcer Dun, but this was never revealed in the completed book. His first name is also a Latin word meaning "prison".

Whilst being pursued by Commander Vimes along the roof tops at Unseen University during a magical thunderstorm, both Carcer and Vimes are transported thirty years into the past, about a week before the Glorious Revolution of the Twenty-Fifth of May. After murdering Pseudopolitan watchman John Keel (forcing Vimes to assume his identity and role as mentor to his younger self), Carcer climbs through the ranks of the Unmentionables, Homicidal Lord Winder's secret police, until he is brought back to the present by Vimes after pursuing him with a death squad under the orders of the new Patrician, Lord Snapcase. Carcer is captured by Vimes at the end of Night Watch, likely to be sentenced to death.

Christine 
A chorus singer at the Ankh-Morpork Opera House, Christine is a pretty, thin blonde with a tendency to wear white and use exclamation marks at the end of every sentence. She is an extraordinarily untalented singer, but the management favours her because of her beautiful appearance and because her father lent a good deal of money for the purchase of the Ankh-Morpork Opera House. The management has her lip-synch on stage to the voice of Agnes Nitt, otherwise known as Perdita X. Nitt. Christine is friendly and kind, but not particularly bright, and she can be unintentionally slighting. She rarely pays attention to anyone but herself.

She is a beneficiary of the sad fact that star quality is a far rarer commodity than talent. The "Phantom" in the story accidentally tutors Agnes instead of Christine when Christine runs away from the ghostly voice coming from her mirror. Agnes realizes what is happening and, in order to continue her training for a second night, she slips some herbs into Christine's hot milk to make her sleepy.

Christine's father told her that a "dear little pixie" would help her career, and she thinks that Agnes might be that pixie.

Cohen the Barbarian
Ghenghiz Cohen, known as Cohen the Barbarian, is a hero in the classical sense, i.e., a professional thief, brawler, and ravisher of women. His name and character are an obvious echo of Robert E. Howard's Conan the Barbarian and Genghis Khan, and of the common Jewish surname Cohen.

The man who introduced the world to the concept of "wholesale" destruction, Cohen is the Discworld's greatest warrior hero, renowned across the Disc for his exploits rescuing maidens, destroying the mad high priests of dark cults, looting ancient ruins, and so on.

On his first appearance in the series he is already an old man, but still tough enough to handle anything the world can throw at him; his opponents often underestimate him because of his age, realizing too late that a man who does for a living what Cohen does and nevertheless survives to such an age must be very good at it indeed. Cohen does not know how old he is exactly. In The Light Fantastic, he says he is 87 years old, and in later books he estimates that he is between 90 and 95 years of age.

Cohen is described as a skinny old man, with a long white beard hanging down below his loincloth, and wearing a patch over one eye. His most distinguishing feature, however, is his smile—his unique dentures are made out of troll teeth, which consist of pure diamond and were inspired when Twoflower showed him his own (more typical) set.

The greatest problems now facing Cohen come from outliving the heroic age and finding himself in a civilized modern world where great battles and astonishing rescues happen rarely except in stories—which is ironic given that the Discworld runs on narrative. One of the rare Discworld short stories, "Troll Bridge", tells of Cohen setting out to slay a troll, only to end up reminiscing with it about the good old days when things were black and white and everyone respected the traditions. Part of Cohen's danger to normal people is that as a barbarian hero he has extreme problems interpreting such things as empty bravado—as a man of his word, he naturally assumes that anyone else saying something like 'I would rather die than betray the Emperor' fully means it. This led to the deaths of several guards and courtiers in the Agatean Empire before everyone wised up.

In Interesting Times Cohen became Emperor of the Agatean Empire, having conquered it with his allies, the Silver Horde. This was intended to be a sort of retirement plan, but Cohen and his chums became bored and then abandoned the Empire in The Last Hero, in which Cohen decides to express his displeasure with the modern world by "returning fire to the gods, with interest". After the rather unsuccessful attempt, he and his friends escaped on the backs of horses belonging to the Valkyries and rode into the sky, seeking to explore the outside of space. His current whereabouts are unknown.

Given a barbarian hero's attractiveness to nubile young maidens, Cohen has quite a lot of children; in The Last Hero he mentions casually that he has dozens. The only one mentioned by name in the novels is Conina, who appears in Sourcery. She wishes to be a hairdresser, but Discworld-style genetics keep getting in the way, causing her to instinctively kill people who threaten her. She was last seen in an amorous relationship with Nijel the Destroyer. She says she knew Cohen and that he took an interest in her education—such as setting a length of corridor with a variety of traps for some heroic training.

In The Light Fantastic, Cohen helps the other two protagonists, Rincewind and Twoflower, save a seventeen-year-old girl named Bethan, who was to be offered as a sacrifice. They fall in love, mainly owing to Bethan's patience and skill at curing Cohen's back problems, and decide to get married, despite Rincewind's apprehensions about their age difference. At the end of the book they are not present, and it is assumed that they have left for their marriage. Cohen does mention that he has been married before, however.

Actor David Bradley played Cohen in the 2008 The Colour of Magic miniseries. The miniseries was produced by The Mob Film Company and Sky One and it combined both The Colour of Magic and The Light Fantastic. It was broadcast on Easter Sunday and Monday 2008. In the miniseries, rather than vanishing, Bethan and Cohen show up at the docks, already married, to bid Twoflower goodbye as he heads back home. Twoflower supplies them with a wedding present of a box of Agatean money, which he believes to be inconsequential but which Rincewind comments, out of earshot of Twoflower, would buy them a small kingdom.

Conina 
The daughter of Cohen the Barbarian and a temple dancer. From her mother, she inherited gold-tinged skin, white-blond hair, a voice that can make "Good morning" sound like an invitation to bed, and a very good figure. From her father, she inherited sinews as strong as a mooring line, muscles as solid as a plank, and reflexes like a snake on a hot tin roof (from relevant pieces of description in Sourcery). She also acquired from Cohen suitable heroic instincts (that is, strong urges to fight, kill, and steal) and an ability to use anything as a deadly weapon. These traits rather get in the way of the profession she really wants to have: hairdressing. By the end of Sourcery, she had fallen in love with Nijel the Destroyer, who could be considered her polar opposite in that he wants to be a barbarian hero but is very bad at it.

Corporal Strappi
A character in Monstrous Regiment, Corporal Strappi is a thin, shouty soldier who loves to terrorize new recruits. Partway through Monstrous Regiment, Strappi disappears, stealing a lot of the Regiments's personal possessions. Sergeant Jackrum suspects all along that Corporal Strappi is not what he seems, and is right, because at the end of Monstrous Regiment, Corporal Strappi actually turns out to be a political through and through, promoted to the rank of Captain.

Cut-Me-Own-Throat Dibbler
Claude Maximillian Overton Transpire Dibbler, usually known as Cut-Me-Own-Throat Dibbler, C.M.O.T. Dibbler, or simply Dibbler, is one of the numerous bit part characters in Terry Pratchett's Discworld novels. Described as Discworld's most enterprisingly unsuccessful entrepreneur, a 'merchant venturer' in Ankh-Morpork, he is most famous for selling meat by-products to unsuspecting souls. His name originates from his catchphrase '... and at that price, I'm cutting me own throat.' He has also been a moving pictures (movie) producer/director where his lack of scruples was entirely reminiscent of the pioneers of modern motion pictures, similarly, the agent of a 'Music with Rocks In' group and the editor of the Ankh-Morpork Inquirer (a loss-making, tabloid newspaper run by the Guild of Engravers) where he fabricated stories. He sold strange green liquid made by monks living on a mountain according to an ancient recipe (Lance-Constable Carrot disputes this, but it turns out that it is actually true; however, the monks making the liquid for him have no idea what he does with it). He has also been known to sell 'fong shooey' advice, mail-order martial arts lessons (under the alias 'Grand Master Lobsang Dibbler'), 'Dibbler's Genuine Soggy Mountain Dew', souvenir snow-globes and advertising space in the Ankh-Morpork Times. In Men at Arms, he made a brief venture at selling food for trolls and later dwarfs. He is at his best selling intangibles; physical merchandise tends to hamper his patter somewhat. Indeed, he once said he was best at 'selling ideas.' Whenever anything physical is being sold, the claims made on his labels range from euphemisms to outright fabrications. As Nobby Nobbs put it after being told of the 'Soggy Mountain Dew' claim of '150% proof', "It ain't got no proof—just circumstantial evidence."

When Dibbler's business plans fail, he falls back to selling (mostly) 'pies with personality' and 'pig' sausages-inna-bun on the streets of Ankh-Morpork. He is described in the books as resembling a rodent, and wears a long poacher's coat covered in pockets. He is usually seen either carrying a tray or pushing a barrow (in [financially] better times). This contains sausages-in-buns, meat pies, and probably some merchandise connected with whatever the latest Morporkian fad is, but only when other ideas have proven to be unsuccessful. His full name is mentioned in Making Money. His nickname was inadvertently suggested to him in Night Watch by the time traveling Samuel Vimes, who instantly rued it. This in itself is an ontological paradox (which was of course evened out by the history monks).

The wizard Rincewind had a theory that equivalents of Dibbler are everywhere. This theory is borne out by the appearance of several versions of Dibbler throughout the Discworld series:

Disembowel-Meself-Honourably Dibhala sold suspiciously fresh thousand-year eggs in the Agatean Empire (Interesting Times). He discusses with Rincewind the possibilities of trade between Ankh-Morpork and the Empire. As tea and silk could be acquired from Klatch, Rincewind suggests the trade of gold, a rare metal in Ankh-Morpork but a ubiquitous one in the Empire. 
Fair Go Dibbler sold the archetypal pie floaters on the lost continent of Fourecks (The Last Continent).
Cut-Me-Own-Hand-Off Dhblah sold disturbingly live yogurt in Omnia (Small Gods). In the Discworld II computer game, his name is spelt D'blah and he gives secrets about pyramid power in Djelibeybi.
Al-Jiblah, a merchant in Klatch (Jingo).
May-I-Never-Achieve-Enlightenment Dhiblang; mentioned in The Last Continent.
Dib Diblossonson sold topless-bottomless smörgåsbord in the Hubland barbarian fjords.
May-I-Be-Kicked-In-My-Own-Ice-Hole Dibooki apparently only gathered whale meat after a conveniently beached whale had exploded into bite-sized chunks of its own accord.
Swallow-Me-Own-Blowdart Dhlang-Dhlang sold green beer, location unknown but suspected to be tropical rain forest, possibly Howondaland.
Point-Me-Own-Bone Dibjla, an Aboriginal Dibbler from Fourecks in the Discworld II PC game.

Other Dibbler equivalents include Ratonasticthenes from Ephebe, mentioned in The Science of Discworld. It was previously thought they might all be related, but the Discworld Companion explains that this is parallel evolution. 'Wherever people are prepared to eat terrible food,' it says, 'there will be someone there to sell it to them.'

Dibbler appeared in the Cosgrove Hall animations of Soul Music and Wyrd Sisters, in which his appearance seemed to be modelled on Private Joe Walker, the spiv in Dad's Army. He also appears in the Discworld computer game. He also appears in Discworld 2, along with many of the other Dibblers, including D'Blah and Point-Me-Own-Bone Dibjla (who is exclusive to the game). Additionally, in Discworld Noir, CMOT Dibbler is mentioned in the game on an Octarine Parrot bill and is said to be the one who gave Lewton his imp-powered coffee machine. A character named C!Mot is briefly mentioned in The Also People, a Doctor Who Virgin New Adventures novel by Ben Aaronovitch, running a T-shirt stall in the marketplace of Whynot. Aaronovitch has confirmed that C!Mot is intended as a parallel Dibbler, although how similar he is to the original (since the People have an entirely non-capitalist society) is unknown. A character called 'Clap-Me-In-Irons Daoibleagh' appears in the webcomic Rogues of Clwyd-Rhan.

In Good Omens, after Crowley's Bentley bursts into flames over the M25 motorway a crowd gathers. There is also a man selling hot dogs, possibly a reference to Dibbler.

The Cretaceous conifer species Sulcatocladus dibbleri is named after CMOT Dibbler.

Daniel "One Drop" Trooper
The Ankh-Morpork official Hangman and executioner, possibly its Chief Executioner, although others have not been specifically mentioned. Trooper is a specialist in the field of Death by Hanging, and it is his skill with a noose which allows him to simulate an actual execution but leave the victim alive which resulted in Moist von Lipwig's survival at the behest of Lord Vetinari. Where he learned his trade is not stated, perhaps trained by members of one or other of the Guilds, but the Patrician, himself trained at The Guild of Assassins is clearly impressed by Mr. Trooper's expertise. He supplements his official stipend, and plans for his retirement, by selling of short lengths of the hanging ropes used in particularly interesting cases—such as the "Albert Spangler" execution—often signed by the victims themselves. Mr Trooper believes his work has value in terms of crime deterrence, based on the fact he never sees criminals more than once.

Didactylos
Meaning "Two-Fingered" in Ephebian, Didactylos is a philosopher, based on Diogenes of Sinope, who comes into the stories in Small Gods. He lives in a barrel inside the wall of the palace of the Tyrant in Ephebe, crafting bespoke philosophies, axioms or aphorisms for scraps. Having apprenticed his nephew Urn as a philosopher, they frequently argue over the merits of natural philosophy, specifically Urn's development of steam power. Although one of the most popular philosophers of all time, Didactylos never earns the respect of his fellow philosophers, due to the fact that he thinks 'about the wrong things'. His authorship of the scroll De Chelonian Mobile, a statement of facts which contradicted Omnian dogma about the shape of the Discworld, partly motivated Vorbis's plan to invade and annex Ephebe. He has been pictured with a lantern though blind and is looking for an "honest man". He is made an Omnian bishop by Brutha, the Cenobiarch and Eighth Prophet.

There is not much mention of Didactylos' life before the events of Small Gods, apart from the facts that he traveled a lot and advised some very important people in his life. The main mentions are of his journeys to Omnia (where he saw a person being stoned) and to Tsort (where his attempts to educate the ruler through subliminal learning resulted in his assassination). It is also mentioned that he never went to Ankh-Morpork in his lifetime.

He appears to be an homage to the famous cynic, Diogenes, who was similarly disliked by his contemporaries for focusing on the 'wrong questions'.

Doctor Cruces

Doughnut Jimmy
Universally known as Doughnut Jimmy, Dr James Folsom is a highly proficient horse doctor who was brought in, under threat of blackmail from Samuel Vimes, to treat Vetinari in Feet of Clay; this rather odd choice being the result of Vimes' knowledge that any human doctor would be contracted to guilds (who all resent Vetinari to varying degrees) and that horse doctors, treating animals worth considerable amounts of money, faced considerable amounts of trouble should their patients die.  Due to his lack of experience with human patients, much of his advice was flawed ("walk him round a bit on loose rein...and no oats").  A former jockey, he won a lot of money by not winning races.  Highly skilled at achieving results, when he treated the racehorse Dire Fortune, it did not fall over until the last furlong.  A considerable testament to his skills, considering that the horse had, in fact, died coming up to the starting line.

D'regs

The D'regs are a nomadic and warlike people who inhabit the desert regions of hubward Klatch, in particular the lawless borderlands between Klatch proper and Hersheba. They will attack anyone, anything and even themselves. In their language, the word for "stranger" is the same as their word for "target". Nonetheless, in a tradition echoing the Afghan law of milmastia or the ancient Greek law of xenia, they will show a guest perfect hospitality for exactly 72 hours, whereupon killing him becomes an option. They can, however, toy with this rule; Samuel Vimes passed one of their many cultural "tests" by refusing to eat the sheep-eye soup traditionally offered foreigners to see if they'd go for it. Their most noted member is 71-Hour Ahmed, who gained his name for violating the ancient 3-day custom by executing a criminal one hour before it expired, an act so unthinkable that other D'regs call him the most feared man in all of Klatch. They have very strict ideas about women fighting: they expect them to be good at it. It is generally said that if a D'reg is one's friend he is one's friend for the rest of one's life, and if he is not one's friend the rest of one's life will be about five seconds; to still be alive five minutes after meeting a D'reg tribe is a clear indication that they really like one. Distrust is generally encouraged among the D'regs, with Ahmed once telling Vimes that his mother would be greatly offended if he trusted her on the grounds that she would feel she did not bring him up right. In Jingo, it's noted that "D'reg" is not actually their name for themselves, but a name given to them by others. It means "enemy" (in this case, everybody's) and the D'regs adopted it out of pride.

Drum Billet

Edward d'Eath

Ella Saturday
The daughter of Baron Saturday of Genua and Mrs Erzulie Gogol. She appears in Witches Abroad as an attractive young woman with brown skin and blonde hair. Her entire life has been controlled by her fairy godmother, Lady Lilith de Tempscire, to ensure that she marries Lady Lilith's pawn, the Duc (pronounced "Duck") (actually a frog). She spends much of her time in the palace kitchens, apparently because she enjoys being helpful, rather than because she is mistreated. Because she helps lay the fires, the palace cook nicknamed her "Embers" (she is, of course, the Discworld version of Cinderella, although the full nickname "Emberella" is referred to as sounding "like something you'd put up in the rain"). At the end of Witches Abroad, she became the Baroness of Genua.

Eric Thursley
A thirteen-year-old demonologist and title character in Eric. He lives at 13 Midden Lane, Pseudopolis. Eric inherited most of his demonology books and paraphernalia (as well as a talking parrot) from his grandfather; his parents, apparently convinced that their son was destined to become a gifted demonologist, allowed him free rein over his grandfather's workshop. Eric was relatively unsuccessful as a demonologist until, with some unknown assistance, he managed to summon Rincewind from the Dungeon Dimensions, originally intending to summon a demon to grant him wishes, namely mastery of the kingdoms of the world, to meet the most beautiful woman ever to have lived, to live forever, and to have a large chest of gold. Eric is granted these wishes during a journey across Time to the Tezumen Empire, the Tsortean War, and the beginning of the universe, albeit as forms of ironic punishment. Eric was last seen escaping from Hell with Rincewind, and it is unknown what happened to him afterwards.

Eskarina Smith

Esmerelda Margaret Note Spelling of Lancre
Daughter of King Verence II of Lancre and Queen Magrat, Princess Esme made her debut as a newborn in Carpe Jugulum, where she is about to be taken for her Christening. Her unusual middle names are the result of a Lancre tradition that whatever the priest says at the naming ceremony is your name (thus, Lancre once had a king called My-God-He's-Heavy the First, as well as a current farmer named James What the Hell's That Cow Doing in Here Poorchick, usually called 'Moocow').  Magrat—who owed her own name to a combination of this tradition and her mother's inability to spell "Margaret"—was determined it would not happen again, hence the "Note Spelling".

Findthee Swing
Captain Swing is the head of the Unmentionables in the Ankh-Morpork of the past in Night Watch. Swing is mainly remembered for his attempt to control crime by ordering all weapons confiscated, reasoning that this would result in a decline in crime figures, failing to acknowledge that criminals do not obey the law in the first place and would actually greatly enjoy the lack of weapons in society.

He is described as a thin, balding man dressed in a long, old-fashioned black coat with large pockets, and supports himself on an opera cane (which is in reality a swordstick, albeit a poorly concealed one). 
Swing moves and speaks in an erratic, jumpy fashion, in bursts and sputters, rather than a continuous flow of movement or sound. He is, however, a skilled swordsman, as he does not resort to flashy swashbuckling, but instead actually attacks his opponent.

Swing always carries with him a large set of calipers and a steel ruler, with which he measures the facial characteristics of people he meets in order to determine their personal traits (phrenology). Its reliability is questionable; according to it, Vimes has the eye of a mass murderer (Vimes says he indeed does... in his other suit) while Carcer's only problem was his environment (most likely all the dead bodies wherever he went).

He is killed by Vimes during the fire at the Unmentionables' headquarters.  On arriving at the Great Desert he tries to use his phrenological skills to determine Death's character, only to find that Death has no characteristics he can measure.

The name Captain Swing has long been associated with civil unrest, being the pseudonym of the (possibly mythical) leader of the Swing Riots.

Gaspode
He first appeared in Moving Pictures. Formerly a street performing animal, he was named after the 'famous' Gaspode, a dog who faithfully stayed by his master's grave and whined (as, according to Gaspode, he had his tail trapped). He (and a number of other animals) gain sapience and the ability to speak as a result of the escaped Holy Wood Dream, and is compelled to travel to Holy Wood to break into the Discworld's newly-established film industry. Having meant to have been a wonder dog, his being a diseased mongrel leads to said role being given to Laddie, a talented but thoroughly stupid pure-bred Ramtop hunting dog. Gaspode, however, does manage to become agent to both Victor Tugelbend and Laddie, successfully renegotiating their contracts with a ten per cent commission. He and Laddie blow up the Odium picture-throwing pit during the disrupted premiere of Blown Away to kill a creature from the Dungeon Dimensions and the destroy the portal created by the "click"; being left for dead, he climbs out of the wreckage and reverts to being a normal dog when the Holy Wood Dream ends.

In Men at Arms, Gaspode has regained his sapience and ability to speak after spending too much time sleeping near the High Energy Magic Building at Unseen University. He assists newly-recruited werewolf Watchwoman Angua in the Night Watch's investigation of a plot involving a 'gonne', the Discworld's only firearm, and avoids run-ins with the Dogs' Guild, a pack of feral dogs led by Big Fido. He reveals that when he was a puppy, he was placed into a sack with a brick (which he thought was his mother) and thrown into the River Ankh (which, due to its unwater-like qualities allowed him to chew through the sack and escape). Gaspode both resents canine subservience to humanity and yearns for masterly companionship, being able to shout commands at dogs as would a human, much to his disgust. After lying about being a family pet, he quickly abandons one given to him as reward for his foiling a plot against Lord Vetinari after they attempt to wash him and give him a collar.

In Feet of Clay, he has become Foul Ole Ron’s Thinking Brain Dog and part of the Canting Crew.

In The Fifth Elephant, Gaspode is employed by Captain Carrot to track down Angua after she flees back to her native Überwald, where he explores his lupine nature.

In The Truth, the existence of a talking dog has become as well-known a rumour as the existence of a rightful King of Ankh-Morpork walking the streets of the city (both of which are true). Gaspode assists the newly-created Ankh-Morpork Timess investigation of a plot to incriminate Lord Vetinari as an informant (going by the name "Deep Bone") and a translator for Lord Vetinari's dog Wuffles, a key witness.

Glenda Sugarbean
A plump, over-breasted girl who runs the Night Kitchen in the Unseen University until the events of Unseen Academicals. The granddaughter of the chief cook at the Assassin's Guild, she has inherited a large number of secret recipes from her. Having spent most of her life forced to do other people's thinking for them, she is overwhelmed with uncertainty when her dim-witted best friend, Juliet, suddenly gains the opportunity to be a supermodel. Initially cautious, she eventually relents and allows Juliet follow her dream. In a similar vein, she, against her own better judgement, allows herself to be swept off her feet by an unlikely romance with a savant orc, Mr. Nutt, and eventually goes on an adventure with him into Uberwald.

Hex
First appearing in Soul Music, Hex is an elaborate, magic-powered, self-building computer (not unlike the 'shamble', a kind of magical device used by the Witches of the Discworld) featuring ants and cheese as part of its architecture, and is housed in the basement of the High Energy Magic Building at the Unseen University (UU) in the twin city of Ankh-Morpork.
 
Hex is a computer unlike any other the Disc has ever seen, which is not particularly exceptional because previously, all other "computers" on the Disc had consisted of druidic stone circles. Programmed via 'Softlore', Hex runs and evolves under the watchful eyes of wizard Ponder Stibbons, who becomes the de facto IT manager at UU because he's the only one who understands what he's talking about.

Hex has its origins in a device that briefly appeared in Soul Music, created by Ponder Stibbons and some student Wizards in the High Energy Magic building. In this form it was simply a complex network of glass tubes, containing "ants as carriers of information". The wizards could then use punched cards to control which tubes the ants could crawl through, enabling it to perform simple mathematical functions.

Lord Sir Harry King
One of Ankh-Morpork's most successful businessmen, Harry King appears in The Truth, Making Money, and Raising Steam, and is referred to in Going Postal and briefly in Night Watch by Lu Tze.  He started out as a mudlark, and developed his career from there. His core business is that of "night soil" removal, but he is also involved in general rubbish collection and recycling. His basic philosophy is that there is nothing that someone will pay to have removed that someone else will not pay to acquire. The sign outside his yard reads "King of the Golden River, Recycling Nature's Bounty." This replaces, at his wife's insistence, the original: "H. King, taking the piss since 1961."  His wife's name is Euphemia "Effie" King (his petname for her is "Duchess"), and their daughters are Daphne and Herminone (through whom Harry King is also a grandfather).

The moniker, "King of the Golden River," is unlikely to be a reference to the River Ankh, which is brown due to centuries of waste being dumped into it, but is more likely to be a scatological reference, as suggested by the previous sign. It may also be a reference to the classic fairy tale of the same name written in 1842 by John Ruskin, particularly considering that the Ruskin work is written for Euphemia "Effie" Gray (compare Harry King's wife), and also possibly a play on the mystical "King of the Silver River" character who appears in the Tolkien-derived fantasy Shannara series by American writer Terry Brooks. Of note is the fact that Harry King employs most of the gnolls in the city (a race that spends all their time picking up trash,) never forgets a debtor and needs to take two baths just to elevate himself to the rank of dirty. One of his little fingers is missing.

Harry keeps ferocious mongrel guard dogs on his property. He would not 'buy posh foreign dogs when he can buy the crossbreeds'. Moist von Lipwig mistakes the dogs for pedigree Lipwigzers (probably Discworld Rottweilers, although Rottweilers are referred to as themselves in Carpe Jugulum,) a particularly savage breed of dog, but one which, as a Lipwig, he is familiar with, and is quite intrigued to find that the commands used to discipline lipwigzers still work on them (though they may have only been responding to the tone and confidence shown by Moist). Harry prefers it when burglars break in, so that he does not have to feed the dogs.

In Snuff, it is revealed that Harry King has since been given a Knighthood.  In Raising Steam, swayed by the new steam engine by Dick Simnel (who becomes romantically involved with Harry King's favorite niece, Emily King), Harry provides the capital to build the "Ankh-Morpork and Sto Plains Hygienic Railway", and at the end of the book is given a peerage.

 Evil Harry Dread 
Evil Harry Dread is the villainous counterpart to Cohen the Barbarian; an old fashioned heroic fantasy type annoyed with how the Discworld has changed (nowadays, modern heroes always block his escape tunnel before confronting him). He's proud of being a Dark Lord, and the heroes don't bear him any grudges; after all, he always lets them win and, in return, they always let him escape (see the Evil Overlord List for the opposite of this concept). Evil Harry Dread always makes an effort to adhere to the 'rules': he intentionally hires stupid henchmen, invests in helmets that cover the whole face (thus making it easy for a Hero to disguise himself) and places Heroes in overly contrived, easily escapable deathtraps.

He appears in The Last Hero, where he joins the Silver Horde on their quest to 'return fire to the gods' by blowing up the mountain. Harry ends up betraying the Horde (as a villain, it is his job), though when the horde confronts him about his betrayal they praise him for still being a reliable Dark Lord even at the end. He was last seen descending from Cori Celesti with the Silver Horde's bard, a man they had kidnapped in order to chronicle the quest. Earlier in the aforementioned book it is stated by Cohen that Harry began with "two lads and his Shed Of Doom".

Herrena, the Henna-haired Harridan
Her name says it all really, an ex-opponent of Cohen, and sometime lover. Ofttimes beset by other barbarians, and even more often tearing across the Disc-scape as an aside. Inspired by Red Sonja of Conan fame. She has a prominent role in The Light Fantastic and a small cameo in Eric.

Hodgesaargh
Castle falconer at Lancre, Hodgesaargh is not his actual name, but some misunderstanding has been caused due to his birds' habit of attacking him when people speak to him (i.e. "Hello, my name is Hodges...ARRRRRGH"). He survives a direct elvish invasion of the Lancre castle, mainly due to one of his birds attacking the elf. His ceremonial outfit of red and gold with a big floppy hat is usually supplemented with about three sticking plasters. One of the birds he breeds is the wowhawk, or Lappet-faced Worrier, which is like a goshawk only more so—it prefers to walk everywhere and faints at the sight of blood. In the book Carpe Jugulum he is responsible for discovering the phoenix. In the same book, he assists Granny Weatherwax in recovering from a vampire attack, though he clearly understood his life was in danger at that point.

Hodgesaargh is based on a real-life keeper of birds of prey named Dave Hodges, who lives in Northamptonshire. He is also the author of The Arts of Falconrie and Hawking.

Hrun the Barbarian
Appeared in The Colour of Magic. Hrun is an archetypal fantasy barbarian: hulking and musclebound yet slow-witted, with very little dress sense, battle-prone, alcoholic and fond of virgins. Hrun owns a magic talking sword, Kring, which he stole following a battle, and lived to greatly regret it due to the sword's talkativeness. He meets Rincewind in Bel Shamharoth's lair, and aids his escape. Upon nearing the Wyrmberg of the Dragonriders, he is captured by the curvaceous Liessa Dragonbidder and her dragon riders. Liessa's plan was to use Hrun to wrest the rulership of the Wyrmberg from her rival brothers and then become queen, Hrun's payment being her hand in marriage. Hrun agrees to the plan and successfully defeats Liessa's brothers with his bare hands, but he refuses to kill them as they are unconscious. Killing unconscious people would have been damaging to his reputation. Liessa agrees to resort to banishing her brothers. In a scene unusually erotic for a Discworld book, Liessa strips naked before Hrun to see if his desire for her will be strong enough for their relationship to work. Before he can accept the "proposal", Rincewind and Twoflower riding upon Twoflower's conjured dragon Ninereeds, snatch up Hrun in a rescue attempt and fly away with him. Hrun is extremely displeased at the event, having been denied both lordship and intimate contact with Liessa through their actions. But Hrun does not need to be angry for long: when Twoflower faints, his dragon, having existed only through his willpower, disappears, causing all three passengers to fall through the air. Liessa catches Hrun on her own dragon, and the couple share a passionate kiss.

Hrun's fate after this is unknown. In Interesting Times, it is revealed that he eventually became the commander of the Watch in an unnamed city. This could also imply that Hrun eventually split up with Liessa. Hrun's separation from Liessa and his enrolment in a Watch unit are not altogether surprising: late on in the Discworld timeline, barbarians and mythical creatures are dying out due to the modernisation of the world, leading them to either fade from existence or have to enroll into society.

Hrun also has some fame, because Twoflower gets very excited at the prospect of meeting Hrun the Barbarian.

Imp Y Celyn
A bard from the decidedly Cymric country of Llamedos. In Soul Music he is possessed by "Music with Rocks in" and becomes the Disc's greatest musician under the name Buddy in the Band with Rocks In along with Cliff and Glod, before dying in a cart crash (a reference to Buddy Holly—Imp's name translates as "bud of the holly". Celyn is Welsh for Holly). The timeline in which this happened has, however, been eradicated following Death's intervention, and he was last seen working in a fried fish stall in Quirm, a clear reference to Kirsty MacColl's song "There's a Guy Works Down the Chip Shop Swears He's Elvis". During the novel several characters comment that he seems a bit "elvish" (also a reference to the same Kirsty MacColl song).  In the animated adaptation of the novel, Imp was voiced by Andy Hockley, and his final fate is changed to working as a gardener at Susan's school; their interactions are rewritten throughout the adaptation to imply a developing romantic relationship.

Miss Iodine Maccalariat
Miss Maccalariat is  receptionist in Going Postal, her voice is like the worst of schoolteachers and her family have performed her role for generations, sucking lemons until their features were pursed enough.

J.H.C. Goatberger
Publisher in Ankh-Morpork. Books published by his company include The Joye of Snacks by A Lancre Witch and the Ankh-Morpork Almanack. Mr Goatberger knows his readership well, and prints his Almanacks on thin paper, as many families use previous editions in their privies.

He appears in Maskerade, where he makes a great deal of money out of Nanny's book, and is surprised she wants some of it.  He also has a sort of appearance in Nanny Ogg's Cookbook, in the form of a series of memos drawn to appear pinned to some of the pages. These form a discussion between him and the head printer, Thomas Cropper, about the book. After previous experience with Nanny Ogg's writing he is anxious to avoid innuendo, but is not entirely successful. His nephew has a similar exchange with Cropper in the pages of The Discworld Almanak.

His name is a play on Johann Gutenberg, with his first initials apparently derived from a phrase referring to Jesus Christ.

John "Mossy" Lawn
A doctor in Ankh-Morpork. He first appeared in Night Watch, as a backstreet "pox doctor", offering medical assistance to "seamstresses". He had trained in Klatch, where he had learnt techniques other Morporkian surgeons distrusted, but which kept patients alive for longer than it took to pay the bill. He also gave free treatment to those who needed it, including those who had been tortured by the Cable Street Particulars. He is quiet (if a tad sarcastic) and almost unshockable. Following his successful delivery of Young Sam, Samuel Vimes gave him a large area of land in the Goosegate area of the city. In Going Postal this is the Lady Sybil Free Hospital. Dr Lawn's preferred method of dealing with the nursing staff is to throw a handful of chocolates in one direction and run in the other as fast as possible. He claims that, when he dies, he wants a bell left on his gravestone so he can have the pleasure of not getting up when people ring. Dr. Lawn is based on an actual retired GP of the same name based in West Yorkshire.

Jonathan Teatime

Juliet Stollop
Featuring in Unseen Academicals, Stollop is a stunningly beautiful and utterly empty-headed girl who becomes a society sensation overnight when offered the possibility to become a supermodel. Scion of a family of football hooligans, she breaks generations of convention by falling in love with Trevor Likely, who supports an opposing team. Eventually, Trev joins the newly formed footballing league, and Juliet embarks on a new life as a WAG and fashion model.

Lavaeolus
The Discworld equivalent of Odysseus. He was the finest military mind on the continent of Klatch. His genius consisted of realising that, if there has to be a war, the aim should be to defeat the enemy as quickly and with as little bloodshed as possible—a concept so breathtaking in its originality that few other military minds have been able to grasp it, and it shows what happens when one takes the conduct of a war away from skilled soldiers. He was a hero of the Tsortean Wars, which he ended by bribing a cleaner to show him a secret passage into the citadel of Tsort. He is also known for having undergone a long and perilous journey home after the war, much like his Roundworld equivalent. It is possible that he is the ancestor of Rincewind as his name means "rinser of winds".

He appeared in Eric and is briefly mentioned in Pyramids.

Lewton
Lewton appears in the third Discworld computer game, Discworld Noir. Lewton is the Disc's first and only private investigator and a former member of the Ankh-Morpork City Watch, having been banished from it for taking a bribe.

Lewton was once a member of the Ankh-Morpork City Watch (sometime before the books). Commander Sam Vimes had a particular unexplained grudge against him. Lewton met and fell in love with a female archaeologist named Ilsa and seemed to have a happy life; a particular moment fondly remembered was the Hotel Pseudopolis. Life seemed to be going well for Lewton. However, one day, Ilsa left Ankh-Morpork for unexplained reasons and this drew Lewton into a depression. He spent countless days drinking and drinking. During these hard times, Lewton took a bribe which ended in him being permanently excluded from the Watch. A few years later, Lewton decided to pick himself up, forget about Ilsa and the rest of his past and start a new life. He became a Private Investigator. However, he rarely got any cases.

When Carlotta Von Uberwald came into his life, Lewton's life changed forever. She gave him the Mundy Case and although Lewton did not know it, she used him as a puppet in order to find Mundy (of whom she said was her lover but he was really an informant for her cult). After discovering this they argued, and during this argument Carlotta kissed and bit Lewton, turning him into a werewolf (or some variant type, several of which are named/referenced in the books themselves). Using his new wolf abilities, Lewton managed to put a stop to Carlotta's cult's plans and save Ankh-Morpork from being consumed by a giant god of destruction.

Lieutenant Blouse
A significant character in Monstrous Regiment, he is Polly Perks' platoon commander. A rather effeminate aristocrat, he previously worked in the Quartermaster-General's Blanket, Bedding and Horse Fodder Department as an administrator, and had no previous experience of field command, his transfer being the result of Borogravia's ever decreasing supply of combat-ready men. He has a remarkable talent for mathematics and technology, suggesting to William de Worde several ways of improving the clacks system, despite never having encountered it before and the system being an 'Abomination Unto Nuggan'. Ironically, despite his rather feminine manner and distinct lack of martial prowess (the expression "a big girl's blouse" is British slang for a wimp), he turns out to be one of the few characters in the novel who is genuinely male. Despite this, he respects and admires the women when he learns the truth, citing historic examples of female warriors throughout the Klatchian continent, and informing their captors that "[he] would not trade them for any six men [they] offered [him]". Blouse's ambition is to have an item of clothing or a food named after him, in the manner of many famous military men. Eventually a type of fingerless glove is named for him. Blouse is promoted to the rank of Major by the end of the book. Blouse seems to be a direct contrast to Jackrum – the small, skinny, naive man is brilliant with numbers, and in one notable scene, thinks faster than Jackrum and uses a signaling device to misdirect enemy forces, whereas Jackrum would have simply smashed the device and moved on; a sign of warfare on the Discworld changing, with intelligence and technology beginning to take the place of bravery and fighting skill.

Liessa Dragonlady
Daughter of Geicha the First, lord of the Wyrmberg, and leader of the dragonriders. An archetypal fantasy barbarian woman (as well as an affectionate parody of the late Anne McCaffery's Dragonriders of Pern series), she has red chestnut hair, is curvaceous and wears almost nothing except for a chainmail harness. Liessa's ambitions are high: having poisoned her father, the traditional means of succession in her family, she is hindered by the fact that as a woman, she cannot become lord of the Wyrmberg and faces intense rivalry from her two brothers. There is however a loophole: by marrying a man who would then become lord of the Wyrmberg through allegiance, she could act as the real power behind the throne. When she foments this plan, Rincewind, Twoflower and Hrun the Barbarian are passing close to her mountain country. Liessa is interested in Hrun, for as a strong but slow-witted warrior, she could use him to defeat her brothers and then place him as a puppet lord. Having kidnapped Hrun and Twoflower (for whom she expresses no interest and has locked away), she tests Hrun by trying to stab him in his sleep. Hrun grabs her wrist and almost breaks it. Convinced of the fellow barbarian's agility, she tells him that he may marry her if he defeats her brothers. Hrun accepts and succeeds in carrying out her orders, but refuses to definitely kill her siblings. Liessa agrees to banishing them instead and tells Hrun tenderly (calling him by name for the first time) that she did not expect such mercy from him. It seems at that point that Liessa is developing genuine feelings for her husband-to-be. But Liessa still has one more trial in store for him: she strips till she is naked, so as to see how much passion he truly has for her. Before the couple can embark onto anything intimate however, Hrun is snatched away by Rincewind and Twoflower riding Twoflower's dragon Ninereeds. In desperation, Liessa summons her own dragon to pursue them (still naked, as Pratchett makes a point of). Ninereeds nearly outruns her but vanishes when Twoflower loses consciousness, causing everyone riding him to fall. Liessa abandons Rincewind and Twoflower to their fate and catches Hrun on her dragon, and the two share a passionate kiss.

Liessa is never seen or mentioned after this. Since Hrun is mentioned to have joined the Watch in Interesting Times, she and Hrun may have split up, or she herself is now part of the Watch, though the latter seems improbable. Liessa's kingdom is not likely to have survived, for by the later books, the barbarian way of life has all but vanished from the Discworld.

She appears in The Colour of Magic. In the Easter 2008 Sky One adaptation of The Colour of Magic, she is played by Karen David.

Lobsang Ludd

Lobsang (born Newgate Ludd) was raised by the Ankh-Morpork Thieves' Guild, but was discovered by Soto of the History Monks when Lobsang performed the Stance of the Coyote (the effect is not fully explained, though it is presumably a reference to Wile E. Coyote's ability to pause in mid-air for comic effect) in order to save his own life after falling from a rooftop, which would have killed him. Afterwards he was sent to and raised in the Temple, where he confounded his teachers by knowing too much, but not knowing how he knows it, and even then not knowing that he knows it till he is asked the specific question. Eventually he was apprenticed to Lu-Tze after his teachers were unable to teach him. This move was not entirely in Lobsang's best interests—due to internal politics, it was hoped they would "break" each other. Lu-Tze theorised that time's hold on him was "loose", for example, Lobsang could demonstrate a negative reaction time—moving towards something before it starts moving, though this theory eventually proved to be wrong. During this time he showed several unique powers, being able to sense the direction of a time disturbance, balancing the "load" of time down to less than a second after a Time Crash (which a man with 50,000 years experience claims he could not even hope to do) and reacting to (and being reacted to by) the Mandala, a visual display of Time on the Disk. After the time crash he goes out into the world to stop the second Glass Clock (under the pretext of being shown the Way of Mrs Cosmopilite), which was being constructed by his then unknown temporal double, Jeremy Clockson.

It is revealed after time stops that he can make his own time, and pairs up with Susan Sto Helit to stop the Clock. He finds out about his "brother" (who is actually him, just having led a different life and born a second after him) and after touching him, they combine, and it is revealed that he is the son of Wen the Eternally Surprised and the personification of Time. After fusing with Jeremy, Lobsang inherited all of Time's powers (though due to his inexperience he needs "time" to recharge them initially) and eventually takes over her role. Due to his nature, even before this, Death could not see him, as he lies outside of Death's influence.

At the end of Thief of Time he shares an unspecified "perfect moment" with Susan Sto Helit (a.k.a. Susan Death), who is also a human who inherited qualities from an anthropomorphic personification. Lobsang inherited powers directly from his parent; she, indirectly from a foster grandparent (Death). However, unlike Susan, who is mostly human, Lobsang is "mostly not" human—he has the mindset and "infuriating smile" of a God, and thinks in 18 dimensions—he claims that even seeing in only 4 is hard, making it difficult to maintain corporeal form. His incarnation of Jeremy had romantic inclinations to Myria LeJean, the first embodied Auditor, who shared the feeling but was not able to express it, due firstly to Jeremy's nullification and secondly due to her committing suicide via 10,000-gallon vat of chocolate at the end of Thief of Time.

Lord Downey

 Head of Ankh-Morpork Assassins' Guild.

Lord Snapcase
The Patrician who came to power after Lord Winder following the Glorious Revolution of the Twenty-Fifth of May. Also known as Mad or Psychoneurotic Lord Snapcase.  During his reign, he was considered "eccentric" rather than mad by the upper classes, but he is now known by most Morporkians, including the nobles, as the Mad Lord. He was sadistic, and extremely fond of torture, much like his predecessor.

Lord Snapcase was succeeded by Lord Havelock Vetinari. There are very few historical records of Lord Snapcase's tyranny. This may be because of Snapcase's mental disorder, which caused him to be very secretive while trying to spy on everyone else.

His obsession with his own security left him no time to govern or affect history. His one recorded act (The Colour of Magic) was to direct the Assassins' Guild to 'inhume' the tourist Twoflower at the request of the Grand Vizier of the Agatean Empire, contrary to the orders of the Emperor; the attempt failed. In Men at Arms, he was mentioned as having a cruet set designed by "Bloody Stupid" Johnson (where, due to Johnson's ineptitude with geometry meant that they are used as storage silos), and in Feet of Clay, he was mentioned to have made his horse a city councillor.

Lord Winder
Patrician of Ankh-Morpork, and predecessor to Mad Lord Snapcase. Also known as Homicidal Lord Winder. During the last years of his reign, he was extremely paranoid, albeit with good reason. He took pride in being pathologically careful about everything, running Ankh-Morpork as a police state, with his dreaded Cable Street Particulars, under the command of Captain Swing, causing dissidents to disappear.

He was deposed as a result of the Glorious Revolution of the Twenty-Fifth of May, during which he was very nearly assassinated by the future Lord Vetinari, but died out of sheer terror instead when Vetinari, dressed all in black, walked up to him in a room full of people, none of them noticing anything. Because their code demands it, assassins have to tell their victim their name and who sent them—Vetinari answered "think of me as your future" and "the city" respectively (indicating that Vetinari already planned to become Patrician some day).

Lupine Wonse
Former childhood friend to Samuel Vimes and later secretary to Lord Vetinari. As the Grand Master of the Elucidated Brethren of the Ebon Night, he summoned a dragon intending it to be killed by a king, whom he would then control. This failed and he found himself personal assistant to the Dragon King in Guards! Guards!. Following a confrontation with the City Watch, he was killed by a metaphor, or possibly the ground, after then-Constable Carrot Ironfoundersson literally "threw the book at him" and sent him stumbling past a missing wall on an upper floor of the Patrician's palace and down to the floor below.

Lu Tze

Lu-Tze first appeared in the novel Small Gods as a minor character described as follows. 

His name is an allusion to the Chinese legendary figure Lao-Tze, the sage to whom the Tao Te Ching is attributed. He is one of the History Monks and spends much of the novel in the background, disguised as a simple sweeper. He also deliberately changes the course of history because he did not like the way things "should" go, replacing a horrific war with a century of peace.

Lu-Tze has a more substantial role in Thief of Time, in which we learn that he is not a monk at all, but "merely" a sweeper at the Monastery of Oi-Dong. The lack of a formal title, in fact, gives him fewer restrictions than his contemporaries. In fact, he uses the same trick (that no-one notices a sweeper) in the monastery as he does when out in the world, and has learnt as much about the nature of time as some of the higher monks simply by tidying up the classrooms. Everyone knows Lu-Tze's name as one of the best monks on the field, but few realise who he actually is.  He is generally referred to just as "Sweeper". This is in part a reference to Martin, the pessimist philosopher and sweeper in Voltaire's Candide.

He is exceptional at martial arts when he needs to be and is the only known master of "Déjà fu", in which the hands move in time as well as space. This is best described as 'the feeling you've been kicked in the head this way before'. Generally he relies on the fact that no-one notices a sweeper, a well-honed ability to talk his way out of anything, and "Rule One", which states "Do not act incautiously when confronting little bald wrinkly smiling men", since such a person is almost always a highly trained martial artist due to the Disc's law of narrative causality. It is the opinion of many that Lu-Tze uses Rule One to bluff his way out of trouble, but, if necessary, he can prove it's no bluff. He does this towards the end of Thief of Time by defeating Lobsang Ludd (then incarnated as the personification of Time) in a fair fight, in front of a crowd of higher monks. As he said, "Def'nitely give the ol' Rule One a fillip."

Lu-Tze also appears in Night Watch, Unseen Academicals, and Raising Steam in a small—but significant—role.  A sweeper is also referenced in The Fifth Elephant and Going Postal.

He is a devout follower of The Way of Mrs. Cosmopilite, a way of life of his own devising which he created after lodging with Marietta Cosmopilite in Ankh-Morpork, some of which is explained in more detail in Lu-Tze's Yearbook of Enlightenment.

Ly Tin Wheedle
Ly is arguably the greatest philosopher on the Disc, although he is usually the one arguing for this. He comes from the Counterweight Continent, home of Rincewind's friend Twoflower. In his home country he is regarded as a great sage because of his peculiar smell, and his many sayings advocating respect for the old and the virtues of poverty are frequently quoted by the rich and elderly. He is first mentioned in The Colour of Magic.

In addition to social philosophy, Ly is also a proponent of natural philosophy. When the philosophical community came to the conclusion that distance was an illusion and all places were in fact the same place, Ly was the philosopher to make the famed conclusion that although all places were in fact the same place, that place was very big. He has also theorised on the physical underpinnings of monarchy, explaining royal succession by use of a particle known as a Kingon (or possibly Queon), musing about the possibility of a communications system based upon the systematic torture of a monarch (although at this point, he had been "thrown out of the bar").

Magrat Garlick

 See Magrat Garlick

Marietta Cosmopilite
Mrs Marietta Cosmopilite is a dressmaker, who appears in Moving Pictures as Vice President of Costuming and Theda Withel's landlady. Earlier in the book she is mentioned as being capable of believing the Disc is under threat from inhuman monsters, that she is a subject of derision for believing that the world is round, and that three dwarfs look in on her undressing. She is correct about the inhuman monsters and the dwarfs (although she is never told about the first one and the second is "only by coincidence"). She is noted as having (appropriate to her name) what would be seen as a contemporary view of the world. Theda claims Mrs. Cosmopilite would not mind Victor Tugelbend coming with her up to her room—assuming they would be going up for sex, but they had a different reason.

She is briefly mentioned in Witches Abroad as being venerated by some younger Ramtops monks who, on the basis that wisdom seems wiser if it comes from further away, trek down to Ankh-Morpork to hear her wisdom. This is usually "bugger off" or something similar, but since the monks do not speak Morporkian, it does not matter much. In Thief of Time it turns out that this was started by Lu-Tze, who spent some time lodging with her, and has a much better understanding of the Way of Mrs Cosmopilite than the monks who followed; he wrote down many of her sayings as guides by which to live his life.   Most have double meanings, serving as both stereotypical utterances of a grouchy older working-class woman, and equally stereotypical pieces of oriental wisdom.   The most notable is perhaps "I wasn't born yesterday" which, as Lu Tze points out, resembles one of the key revelations of Wen the Eternally Surprised, who, in reference to the continually destroyed and renewed nature of the universe, and the constancy of revelation, said "I was not born-yesterday!".

Mavolio Bent
Mr Mavolio Bent is the Head Cashier and all but in charge of the Royal Bank of Ankh-Morpork. He was introduced to the discworld series in the book Making Money. He has been in employment at the bank since he was thirteen, when he came to the city with a group of travelling accountants. He was born as a clown (Charlie Benito), but his first time performing was severely affected by the audience laughing at him. He fled the show, and he happened upon a group of travelling accountants, and discovered his talent for numbers. From then on, he renounced his clowning heritage, and went to work at the bank.

Mr Bent eventually accepts his clown heritage after having a mental breakdown because (among other things) he made his first mathematical mistake. It appears that he remains at the bank though, in an attempt to honour his clown heritage, he returns to work wearing a red nose.

Mr Bent resided in Mrs. Cake's Boarding House. This has likely changed since marrying a 'Miss Drapes' at the Fool's Guild Chapel of Fun by Reverend Brother "Whacko" Whopply, in a 'whitewash wedding'.

He is possibly inspired in part by John Major who was born the son of a music hall performer, but left to join a bank,  eventually becoming Prime Minister of the UK 1990-1997.  Andrew Rawnsley said that he "ran away from the circus to join a troupe of accountants."

Mr Hong
Mr Hong never appears in any of the books, having (apparently) died before the start of any of the stories, but appears to form an important part of Ankh-Morpork's collective memory. In several Discworld books, a character is admonished to "remember what happened to Mr Hong when he tried to open the Three Jolly Luck Takeaway Fish Bar on the site of the old fish god temple in Dagon Street on the night of the full moon." This incident appears to act as a deterrent for Morporkians against meddling with the occult or supernatural or doing something that is patently stupid. Though it is never satisfactorily explained exactly what happened, in Jingo it is revealed that only his kidney and a few bones were found; in the game Discworld Noir his shop was used as a location for one of the murders. Found boarded up, deep investigation reveals that a local thespian from the Dysk theatre was eaten there.

Mr Pin
Mr Pin is the brains of the New Firm, a duo of interloping criminals in The Truth. In general Mr Pin makes the plans and decides where they are going to go and what they are going to do, but he is open to suggestions from his partner. Both men can become violent, but Mr Pin's violence is more directed and instrumental. The background of Mr Pin is much more vague than his partner, Mr Tulip. After having an iconograph taken of him by Otto Chriek using dark light (light on the opposite side of darkness), Mr Pin experiences guilt and extreme paranoia for the various crimes committed by the New Firm.

He comes to a rather sticky end when he is impaled by the desk spike of William de Worde in the offices of The Ankh-Morpork Times after being trapped in a cellar with molten lead raining from the ceiling as the building burned, killing Mr Tulip to use his body as a raft and to steal his potato (which he believed granted its possessor a path to reincarnation). Mr Pin is then reincarnated into a potato resembling his face in a look of surprise, which is chipped and deep fried.

Mr Pin and Mr Tulip are very similar in many respects to Mr. Croup and Mr. Vandemar, a violent duo in Neverwhere, written by Neil Gaiman. The two authors have collaborated before in Good Omens, and sometimes make reference to each other's works. However, Pratchett has denied any conscious reference in this case.

It is possible that Mr Pin and Mr Tulip are taken as analogues of the Marvel Comics characters, the Kingpin and the Rose, organised crime figures.

Mr Salzella
The Director of Music at the Ankh-Morpork Opera House in Maskerade, most notable for an absolute hatred of opera. He embezzles money and murders the people who find out, blaming the murders on the Opera Ghost.

Salzella is eventually found out and proves to be just as "infected" with operatic romanticism as everyone else in the building. Due to the Discworld's rather literal adherence to the laws of narrative convention, this is not an entirely mental issue: He is killed in an extremely operatic duel with the Ghost and spends two pages on a final monologue before keeling over. He only had a sword theatrically thrust under his armpit, but, according to the witches present, failed to notice this.

Mr Slant
Mr Slant is the president of the Guild of Lawyers, a position that he has held for a long time due to being a zombie. He is also one of the three  founders of Morecombe, Slant, and Honeyplace, Ankh Morpork's leading legal practice. Considering that Mr Slant is a zombie and both Mr Morecombe and Honeyplace are vampires, they are old enough to have been around when many laws were first written up. Promotion is also an unlikely prospect in the firm. He is the undisputed head of any legal action in the city and is one of the major members of the civil council. However, Mr Slant has also been involved in more sinister affairs. He has attempted to aid in deposing Lord Vetinari from power several times, but only through serving other clients and not from an actual desire of his own to depose of Vetinari.

He became a zombie after having been convicted of a crime and decapitated but, since he defended himself, refuses to pass on until his descendants pay the legal fees.

Mr Tulip
Mr Tulip is, along with Mr Pin, a member of the New Firm, a duo of interloping criminals in The Truth. He is something of a contradiction: a remorseless killer with the refined soul of a true fine-art connoisseur. He is differentiated from a common criminal by his habit of removing works of art from houses before committing arson, the ability to distinguish between priceless works of art and common forgeries, an encyclopaedic knowledge of hundreds of years of great artists, artisans and their works, and a refusal to use any artworks as blunt weapons or to profit from their ultimate destruction. He would not for example use a candlestick to knock someone out cold or steal it for its silver content. He is the muscle of the New Firm and, though an instinctive killer, recognises Mr Pin's cognitive skills and leaves the thinking to him. He also suffers a mild speech impediment, causing him to insert "—ing" mid-sentence (the suffix of an action verb without the verb itself). His primary skill in the New Firm is the application of his apparently unlimited supply of unspecific anger; Tulip has turned mindless violence into an art form.

Mr Tulip has a tendency to buy and consume anything sold in little bags in an attempt to acquire drugs. These tend to be rather common inert items such as chalk, pickles and corned-beef sandwiches. The few times he's actually acquired real narcotics, they have been suitable only for trolls.

Mr Tulip's past is hinted at being dark and fearful, a place that even Mr Tulip is afraid to remember. The place where he lived had been in the middle of a war zone. At the last, even their own soldiers were killing farmers, desperate to find any food.

He also has a superstition that those who die while holding a potato will be reincarnated. This belief, which is quite firm, is based on hearing his grandmother saying, during a famine, "You will be alright if you have your potato." He is killed by Mr Pin near the end of the novel and used for a life raft as molten lead flows around the pair. Unfortunately, Mr Pin also steals his potato shortly before killing him, but Mr Tulip manages to retain the memory of a potato in the afterlife. Death, perplexed at the concept of a soul having a strong but completely vague belief, allows him to reincarnate as a woodworm. His final thought in the novel is, 'This is —ing good wood!"

Lord Mortimer, Duke of Sto Helit
"Mort", short for Mortimer, is the title character in Mort. He is first seen as the overly thoughtful son of a farmer in the Octarine Grass Country, near the Ramtops. Having proved himself unworthy as a scarecrow he is chosen by Death to be his apprentice. Mort is described as being very tall and skinny, with muscles like knots in string. He has a shock of bright red hair, and walks as if he is made entirely of knees.

Mort starts off at the bottom, learning to accept his position while mucking out the stables, and trying to ignore Ysabell, Death's adopted daughter. When Death feels in need of a break, Mort takes over The Duty. Unfortunately for Mort, his feelings for a teenage princess of Sto Lat get in the way of his job and he starts off a chain reaction of events by impulsively preventing her assassination. Reluctant to tell his master about his gaffe, Mort tries various unsuccessful methods to fix the situation. After fighting and losing to Death, Mort was given an extra lease of life when the Grim Reaper chose to turn over his Lifetimer. This allowed Mort to stay in the world of the living.

After the events of Mort, Mort leaves Death's service and marries Ysabell. The couple are given the title of Duke and Duchess of Sto Helit, and later also become the parents of Susan Sto Helit. They subsequently meet their end after a freak accident sends their carriage plunging into a ravine, as revealed in Soul Music. They had discussed this with Death and had turned down his offer to extend the duration of their existence on the grounds that it would not be the same as actually lengthening their lives.

In The Light Fantastic, Rincewind overhears Twoflower teaching the Four Horsemen of the Apocalypse (Death, Famine, Pestilence and War), how to play bridge. At one point, War refers to Death as "Mort" but we later learn that the only people in the room (other than Twoflower), were Death, Famine, Pestilence and War ("mort" is "death" in Quirmian/French).  The name might be a possible reason as to why Death chose Mort as his apprentice.

In the Cosgrove Hall animation of Soul Music, Mort is voiced by Neil Morrissey. In 2004 BBC Radio 4 adapted Mort, with the title character voiced by Carl Prekopp and Ysabell being voiced by Clare Corbett. Mort is included in Wayne Barlowe's Barlowe's Guide to Fantasy.

Nijel the Destroyer
Nijel the Destroyer, son of Harebut the Provision Merchant, is a would-be barbarian hero, appearing in Sourcery. Nijel meets Rincewind in a snake pit and they escape together. He falls in love with Conina (a barbarian heroine who wants to be a hairdresser but cannot due to her genes) at first sight, and she with him. He is a clerk who wants to be a Barbarian Hero and is currently half-way through a book on the subject, which includes a table of wandering monsters and tends to resemble a Dungeons & Dragons manual. In addition to the standard loincloth, Nijel wears woolen long underwear—his mother insisted.

Olaf Quimby II
A past Patrician of Ankh-Morpork referred to in The Light Fantastic, Olaf Quimby was noted for his interest in honest and accurate descriptions as well as proper standards for everything, particularly metaphor. As Patrician, he used his power to enforce laws against creative exaggeration in writing. For example, no bard was allowed to say of a hero that "all men spoke of his prowess" on pain of death; he should instead add that some people spoke ill of the hero and that still others did not know of him at all. Similarly, the phrase "her face launched a thousand ships" could only be used to describe a beautiful woman if relevant shipyard records were produced or, failing that, evidence that the woman's face resembled a champagne bottle.
    
As far as standardization was concerned, Quimby instituted the Ankh-Morpork Bureau of Measurements, in which is kept the standardized Blunt Stick  (originally a Sharp one was on display as well, but very few things were found worse than a poke in the eye with it), the recipe for the Pie that It May be As Nice As, Two Short Planks and the stone used in the original Moss-Gathering Trials. This Bureau is maintained by the current Patrician, Lord Havelock Vetinari, on the grounds that the sort of people whose minds work like this ought to be kept busy, or they might do anything.

Quimby's reign ended when he was killed by a disgruntled poet during an experiment to test the truth of the saying "The pen is mightier than the sword". In his memory, it was amended to read: "The pen is mightier than the sword only if the sword is very small and the pen is very sharp".

It has been noted that many Ankh-Morporkians tend to have a certain literal mindedness. It is not known if this is the result of Quimby's rule, or simply a natural trait that reached its peak in him.

Polly Perks
The main character in Monstrous Regiment. A Borogravian girl of 16 who joined the army under the name Oliver Perks to rescue her brother Paul and save her family's inn. She chose her false name, Oliver, because it corresponded with the folksong "Sweet Polly Oliver", which is about a girl running off to join the army. As a member of the Cheesemongers, Private 'Ozzer' Perks serves with the colourful Sgt Jackrum, a reformed vampire named Maladict, a troll called Carborundum, an Igor, and a few even stranger people, who are, in fact, all women in disguise.

By the end of the book, Polly is a seasoned soldier, and it turns out, not the important one in the unit. At the end of the book, Polly has left the army, but rejoins as a sergeant when Borogravia is invaded again.

Princess/Queen Kelirehenna (Keli)
Daughter of King Olerve the Bastard of the Sto Plains kingdom of Sto Lat, and the last person between the Duke of Sto Helit and the throne, she was saved from assassination by Mort, who found himself unable to allow her would-be assassin to kill her. Originally the universe insisted that she should be dead, which meant that most people simply refused to acknowledge her existence unless she made her presence clear. With the assistance of Ignius Cutwell, a local wizard, she attempted to be crowned Queen in a fast-tracked coronation before the reality enveloping Sto Lat collapsed. However, after Death managed to sort out the alterations to the timeline with the Gods, she became Queen Kelirehenna I, Lord of Sto Lat, Protector of the Eight Protectorates and Empress of the Long Thin Debated Piece Hubwards of Sto Kerrig.

Queen Keli still ruled at the time of Soul Music, when she ejected the Band with Rocks In from the city by royal proclamation. Sto Lat still had a queen by the time of Going Postal, though she is not mentioned by name. If it is her, she would be the first person on the Disc other than the Patrician to have her face on a stamp.  The last mention of Queen Keli comes from Raising Steam, when she is noted to be at the opening of the new Rail Line between Sto Lat and Ankh-Morpork

Was voiced by Alice Hart in the BBC Radio Four adaptation of Mort.

Pteppicymon XXVIII (Teppic)
His Greatness the King Teppicymon XXVIII, Lord of the Heavens, Charioteer of the Wagon of the Sun, Steersman of the Barque of the Sun, Guardian of the Secret Knowledge, Lord of the Horizon, Keeper of the Way, the Flail of Mercy, the High-Born One, the Never-Dying King of Djelibeybi (lit. "Child of the Djel", the Disc's version of Egypt) is the main character in Pyramids. The first king to leave the kingdom, he was trained at the Ankh-Morpork Assassins' Guild. He passed his final exam by a fluke, having already decided he was not going to kill anyone. His cosmopolitan nature clashed with the hidebound traditions of the kingdom and the even more hidebound high priest Dios, and after saving Djelibeybi from destruction and shaking up its traditions, he abdicated, leaving the throne to his half-sister Ptraci I.

Ptraci I
Queen Ptraci I of Djelibeybi. Pteppic's half-sister and successor. A former handmaiden, she was originally condemned to death for not voluntarily dying in order to serve the previous king in the afterlife (effectively on Dios's orders as Teppic wished to grant her clemency). The Djelibeybian priests thought she would be easy to control. They turned out to be very wrong. Like her half-brother she is keen to get in some decent plumbing. Appears in Pyramids; by the end of the novel she is enthusiastically embracing many of the stranger regimens, such as bathing in ass's milk, favoured by Cleopatra.

Reacher Gilt
Reacher Gilt appears in the novel Going Postal.  He is the head of a consortium of financiers who had been embezzling from the clacks network since it was set up, and who, when it reached the point of collapse, bought the original owners out with their own money. A ruthless businessman with a piratical appearance, including an eyepatch and a cockatoo that, instead of saying "pieces of eight", said "twelve and a half percent" (that is, one eighth), he was a shameless con-artist and fraudster whose business style was described as playing "find the lady with entire banks". Under his management, the clacks network became more profitable, but less reliable. As the new owners did not really understand the clacks the way the previous management had, they worked it until it broke. He maintained his monopoly by killing anyone attempting to set up another network, including Robert Dearheart's son, John, and employing the banshee Mr. Gryle to do so. When challenged about the clacks monopoly and the lack of choice it presented, Gilt stated that customers had the choice to use the clacks or travel great distances on horseback to deliver their messages themselves. Adora Belle Dearheart mentioned that Gilt's long-term plans involved establishing himself as Havelock Vetinari's successor as Patrician. After his dealings were uncovered, Lord Vetinari offered him the "choice" of becoming head of the Royal Mint, or walking out a door, without a floor behind it. He chose the latter, earning the grudging respect of Vetinari for staying true to his beliefs about choice.  In the TV adaption of Going Postal, Gilt is portrayed by David Suchet.

Rincewind

Roland de Chumsfanleigh
Pronounced "de Chuffley" (which, as Pratchett says, is not his fault). Son of the Baron of the Chalkland. First introduced in The Wee Free Men, the first novel in the Tiffany Aching series. Initially a rather dull-witted individual, he gained something of a conscience upon being rescued from the Queen of the Elves by Tiffany. When he is 12 years old, Roland is kidnapped by the Queen, and does not age during his captivity since time hardly passes while in Fairyland. When a 9-year-old Tiffany finds him there in The Wee Free Men, a year has passed on the Disc since his disappearance, and so he would have been 13 in the "real" world.  Roland personally apologised to Tiffany when his father made out that he had in fact rescued her, as would be expected in such a story. Tiffany was nonplussed, and claimed she needed no apology or recompense so long as he ruled justly when he became Baron.

Roland's father eventually fell very ill, and his two scheming aunts used their new position as his guardians to rob his family blind. Roland fought back as far as he could, in the process learning a great deal about surviving sieges and the art of insurgency. When his aunts block up his bedroom door to stop him from leaving, he muses that he has only been left with a false panelled hidden door, a passage behind a tapestry and a trap door in his floor.  He has also been hoarding food, and rescuing much of the castle's silverware and paintings.

In Wintersmith, Roland was reluctantly recruited by the Nac Mac Feegle to perform the role of the mythic Hero in the Dance of the Seasons, to put right the damage Tiffany had caused by interfering in the dance and the proper roles of the Wintersmith and the Summer Lady. Against all expectations, he acquitted himself admirably. There are signs that his feelings for Tiffany extend somewhat beyond gratitude. He also gave Tiffany a box of watercolors, one of which was turquoise, allegedly very expensive on the Discworld.  When Tiffany went to Lancre to study witchcraft in A Hat Full of Sky, Roland gave her a silver necklace in the image of the giant white horse that is carved into the Chalk; Tiffany uses the necklace as a symbol to draw on the power of her homeland in times of crisis.

By the fourth book in the series, I Shall Wear Midnight, Roland and Tiffany have realised that simply being different from those around them does not mean they are similar, and Roland decides to marry Letitia Keepsake, a good-natured if somewhat pampered aristocrat. While Tiffany is at first bitter about this, she eventually comes to terms with the situation and ultimately marries the couple herself.

Ronald Rust
An Ankh-Morpork nobleman, he first appears in Men At Arms, in which he is one of the nobles who does not take seriously d'Eath's proposal of restoring the Ankh-Morpork monarchy by installing Captain Carrot as King. In this novel he seems to have keen political instincts; it is stated that the Rusts have survived by not being romantic.

Lord Rust makes more sizeable appearances in Jingo and Night Watch, wherein he appears overly bred and arrogant; a brief subsequent appearance in Monstrous Regiment suggests he still has some of the intelligence of his earlier portrayal.  Lord Rust's most defining characteristic, along with his arrogance, is his unsurpassed military and strategic incompetence (or, at least, his ability to achieve goals only by simultaneously sustaining devastating losses; he is described as operating on the theory that a battle was a glorious victory if enemy casualties outnumber friendly casualties, coupled with the inexplicable ability to be repeatedly chosen to command large armies and similar organizations, hence his description as "The god's gift to the enemy, any enemy, and a walking advertisement for desertion."  He is ridiculously brave, often simply charging while the weapons just miss him, every time. Also notable is his method of dealing with unpleasant occurrences. He simply mentally edits them out. In Snuff, he is portrayed as an elderly man in a wheelchair, with a sunken look. His son, Gravid, was an entrepreneur involved in a scheme in which goblins were captured in the Shires (a border region between Ankh-Morpork and Quirm) and enslaved on Howondaland tobacco plantations with the resultant cigars and snuff (as well as assorted troll narcotics) being smuggled into Ankh-Morpork; after this was discovered, Gravid was disinherited and exiled to Fourecks.

Rosemary Palm
Head of the Guild of "Seamstresses" (actually prostitutes).  Her establishment is used as a place to stay by Granny Weatherwax and Nanny Ogg in Maskerade (on the recommendation of 'Nev' Ogg, though Granny Weatherwax had stayed there previously with Eskarina Smith in Equal Rites) and by Carrot on first settling in Ankh-Morpork (in Guards! Guards!). Mrs Palm was considered almost a witch by Granny. Her character also appears in Night Watch. Her name is a play on the saying "a date with Rosie Palms," a slang term for masturbation.  Rosemary Palm is similar to real-life brothel owner, Lou Graham, whose employees were officially accredited as "Seamstresses".

Rufus Drumknott
Secretary to Patrician Vetinari of Ankh-Morpork, following the death of Lupine Wonse. First appears in Men at Arms.  Commonly seen entering and leaving the presence of the Patrician bearing either paperwork or verbal information on the activities of other denizens of the city, or the Discworld in general, Drumknott seems not to think much about the political implications of the information he works with, believing in filing for its own sake. During The Truth he was seemingly attacked by the Patrician—later revealed to be a lookalike hired to try to get Vetinari deposed—and by the time of Going Postal, was responsible for relaying the orders of the Patrician in assigning tasks to other clerks. William de Worde described him as someone with "no discernible personality."  In Unseen Academicals, he reveals that he cannot understand the fuss that is being made about football, both old and new. In Raising Steam, he develops a childlike interest in the newly-emergent railway, wishing to spend more time aboard Iron Girder, the Discworld's first steam locomotive.

In the TV adaptation of Going Postal, Drumknott is portrayed by Steve Pemberton.

Sacharissa Cripslock
The daughter of an engraver (who possibly appeared in Maskerade, working for Goatberger) she became a reporter for the Ankh-Morpork Times, having originally arrived at the print works to complain about the invention of moveable type. Somewhat eclectically attractive, she possesses at least two features that would have made various artists from various times in history bite their easels in two—although, it must be said, that having a nose that would appeal to Rembrandt and a neck that would inspire Pablo Picasso does not, in and of itself, guarantee that the whole succeeds as a work of art. It is also implied that she has an excellent figure ("other features that are considered attractive in any time"). She tries to hide her buxom qualities, without success. However, it does mean a lot of men are happy to tell her things. She possesses the ability to think in headlines, and has gained valuable experience as an editor, allowing her to, e.g., reduce an article's length in half merely by crossing out all the adjectives. Appears in The Truth, Going Postal and Making Money. In Going Postal she wears a wedding ring and is assumed to be married, presumably to William de Worde, although she still refers to herself as Miss Cripslock. She is very respectable, meaning there is a lot of unrespectability waiting to come out.

As of Making Money, she seems to have become the Times' chief liaison to Moist von Lipwig, and she has developed a talent for asking devious questions that, if answered thoughtlessly, would make for interesting and embarrassing news headlines. Moist, for his part, regards the interviews with her as a guaranteed thrill requiring him to think quickly on his feet.

In the TV adaptation of Going Postal, Miss Cripslock is portrayed by Tamsin Greig.

Pratchett has stated on Twitter that she is married to William de Worde, retaining her maiden name for professional purposes.

Seldom Bucket
Seldom Bucket was a big man in cheese production in Ankh-Morpork, but who, just prior to the events in Maskerade, purchases the Ankh-Morpork Opera House. He is obsessed with making money from the Opera and is horrified to learn how expensive seemingly trivial items (such as ballet shoes and musical instruments) can be. When he starts to hear about the strange murders being committed by the "Opera Ghost", his first concern is how expensive the murder might prove to be, though he does acknowledge the seriousness of the event as well. His relationship with Mr Salzella is one of mutual distrust and Mr Bucket has no time for Salzella's dry wit and humour, especially when Salzella is making crude comments about people having been hanged.

Sergeant-Major Jack Jackrum
A character in Monstrous Regiment, Jackrum is an immensely fat, hard-bitten Borogravian sergeant major with decades of military experience. He is known, either personally or by reputation, by practically every soldier in the Borogravian Army, and boasts that he is probably quite well known by the soldiers of the enemy armies too. Jackrum has, over the years, been the sergeant in command of (or under) a number of young soldiers who then rose up to the Army's high command, and thus wields considerable influence. It is stated on several occasions that Jackrum should have actually retired long ago, with his official resignation papers constantly following him around by mail, but he always finds some excuse to get out of them; at one point in the book, he resigns his commission so that he can brutally assault an enemy soldier without dealing with military protocol and is subsequently re-enlisted afterwards. Jackrum trains Polly Perks and gradually earns the respect of all the recruits.

When confronting the heads of the Borogravian army, Jackrum reveals (after asking the other two-thirds to depart the room) that almost a third of the commanders are women, whom he uncovered during his time in the army, something that became something of a hobby for the sergeant.  Ironically, Jackrum turns out to be a woman as well, having joined the army in her youth along with her lover, who died in battle, leaving the young Jackrum pregnant, something that she covered up by taking her considerable accumulated leave.  When the novel ends, Jackrum has reunited with her long-lost son on the advice of Polly, although she has apparently introduced herself as his father rather than his mother, on the grounds that a fat old woman showing up claiming to be his mother would just be an inconvenience, but a distinguished sergeant-major claiming to be his father would be something to be proud of.

Stanley Howler
One of the two remaining employees of the Ankh-Morpork Post Office prior to Moist von Lipwig being made Postmaster. Raised by peas (no further explanation is given), Stanley has a tendency towards obsessive behaviour, coupled with violent incidents (his 'little moments') when under stress. He used to be one of the more obsessive of Ankh-Morpork's large number of pin collectors (called 'pinheads'), to the point that all the other collectors thought he was "a bit weird about pins". Fortunately his liking for pins can be used to calm him down from his, as called in the books, 'Little Moments'.

However, following the events of Going Postal, in which the destruction of his collection coincided with the invention of the postage stamp, he redirected his obsession to stamp collecting and philately. Stanley's surname was not revealed in the book, but is given in various peripheral material relating to Discworld stamps. Stanley Howler is another example of parallel Discworld-Terrestrial history: on Earth, Stanley Gibbons is a company which publishes catalogues of stamps for collectors; the howler is a type of monkey, and the gibbon, like Unseen University's Librarian, is an ape.

In the TV adaptation of Going Postal, Stanley is played by Ian Bonar.

Susan Sto Helit

Tacticus
General Callus Tacticus was a soldier of the Ankh-Morpork Empire, and is widely proclaimed to be the greatest general of all time. In fact, on the Discworld the word 'tactics' was derived from his name. He has been dead for nearly 2000 years by the start of the Discworld series. In Jingo his name is given as Gen. A. Tacticus. In Wintersmith, however, his first name is given as Callus.

Tacticus conquered a large area of the Discworld, both around the city of Ankh-Morpork and well into the rimward continent of Klatch. The ruined fortress city of Tacticum, located in the Klatchian desert, is encountered in Jingo. Since his campaigns were as expensive as they were effective, the rulers of Ankh-Morpork tried to get rid of Tacticus in a respectful and appropriate way. When at one point the far-flung city of Genua, whose royal family had interbred itself into extinction (the last king having tried to continue the royal bloodline with himself), asked Ankh-Morpork for a Duke, Tacticus was promoted and sent there. Immediately upon becoming a Genuan citizen, he evaluated the question of the greatest military threat posed by any single other nation. Tacticus therefore declared war on Ankh-Morpork, which (it is implied) was the reason why Ankh-Morpork lost its large empire.

When Vimes got a copy of Tacticus' autobiography from the Librarian, he formulated a characteristically cynical opinion as to why Tacticus, although respected, was not much liked by history: Tacticus did not get a huge number of his men killed by his own arrogance and incompetence. Snippets of Tacticus' advice turns up in various Discworld chronicles, and it can be gathered that he was a very realistic, down-to-earth general. For example, the section of his autobiography entitled "What to Do When One Army Occupies a Well-Fortified Fortress on Superior Ground and the Other Does Not" begins with the sentence "Endeavour to be the one inside." Another good example of Tacticus' sense of pragmatism would be his maxim "It is always useful to face an enemy who is prepared to die for his country. This means that both he and you have exactly the same aim in mind."

Tawneee
Tawneee (pronounced with each "e" as a separate syllable) is an exotic dancer, introduced in Thud! Tawneee is, in fact, merely her stage name; her real name is Betty. She is Nobby Nobbs's girlfriend for most of the book; they met when Nobby caught her eye while slipping an IOU into her garter belt. The fact that she is Nobby's girlfriend is somewhat shocking considering his barely human appearance and her incredibly stunning good looks. However, her looks make her unapproachable, as all men have considered her out of their league; Nobby only asked because he was so used to rejection he would have simply regarded it as just another day. Despite her profession, she is as humble as a caterpillar, and has about as much brains. She was completely innocent about sex, and was completely unaware that her job could be considered "acting like a floozy"; in the end, Angua and Sally explain the facts of, well, everything. Meanwhile, Nobby considers letting her down gently because she did not know her way around a kitchen.

Theda Withel
A Holy Wood actress in Moving Pictures. Using the name Delores De Syn, she starred in several movies with Victor Tugelbend, usually as the maiden to be rescued. She is descended from the High Priestess of Holy Wood, and while sleeping, she was repeatedly possessed by an unknown force, possibly the priestess. This force used Ginger to attempt to awaken the Holy Wood guardian, which would have put a stop to the Holy Wood magic and prevented the Things from the Dungeon Dimensions from breaking through to the Discworld. Her name is a reference to Theda Bara.

Tolliver Groat
One of the two remaining employees of the Ankh-Morpork Post Office prior to Moist von Lipwig being made Postmaster. A very old man in a cheap wig, Groat had spent most of his career in the Post Office as a Junior Postman, since until von Lipwig's arrival none of the other Postmasters appointed by Lord Vetinari had survived long enough to promote him. Groat does not trust doctors, which is perfectly understandable since there are very few reliable doctors in Ankh-Morpork. He instead treats himself with a variety of apparently dubious "natural" home remedies (later revealed to be, in actuality, extraordinarily effective), including concoctions made with sulfur or arsenic, and a poultice made of bread pudding. He is a habitual speaker of Dimwell Arrhythmic Rhyming Slang, the only known rhyming slang in the universe that does not actually rhyme. In Going Postal, Groat tells Moist von Liping about his hair that, "It's all mine, you know, not a prunes". Explanation reveals that in Dimwell slang, "syrup of prunes" means wig. (In Cockney rhyming slang, the expected derivation would be "syrup of figs.") Another example given in the text is "cup-and-plate"—no definition is given, but "He's a bit cup-and-plate in the head" implies it means "not quite right."

Tolliver also had a very small part in Wintersmith. The wintersmith approaches him to take some sulfur, so that he would become a man. This incident was reported in The Ankh Morpork Times, and a widow approached him, swayed by 'a man who knows his hygiene.' It is now believed that they are enjoying a relationship, as she was seen walking with him. His trousers and socks are confirmed as being highly explosive, as a result of the gunpowder-like solution they are treated with. His wig is believed to be sentient, and is certainly self-mobile, having escaped from a locked cupboard in the hospital. In Making Money, Groat was left in charge as acting-Postmaster General while Moist von Lipwig assumed his de facto position as chairman of the Royal Bank of Ankh Morpork.

In the TV adaptation of Going Postal, Groat is portrayed by Andrew Sachs.

Trevor Likely
A worker at the Unseen University's candle vats, though he seldom does any work, leaving most of it to the affable goblin (actually orc) Mr. Nutt. Instead, he prefers to kick a tin can around, something at which he has gained an almost magical proficiency. Although seemingly destined for the game of football, he refuses to play, on account of his Mum, who saw his father, the only player to score four goals in a career, die during a game. But his mind begins to slowly change after an encounter with the lovely Juliet Stollop, and after the tactical substitution of the ball with a tin can, scores the winning goal in the inaugural game of the new football league.  Appears in the book Unseen Academicals.

Twoflower
Twoflower is a native of the Agatean Empire, on the Counterweight Continent, living in the major sea port of Bes Pelargic where he works as an "inn-sewer-ants" clerk. The first tourist ever on the Discworld, he wrote "What I Did on My Holidays" after his return to the Empire. His name is most likely a mistranslation by Rincewind; his real name is Billy (Bi-Lily = two flower).

He is described as having "four eyes" by a beggar at the docks early in the events in The Colour of Magic, who "found himself looking up into a face with four eyes," implying he actually wears glasses, although Josh Kirby's dust jacket illustrations for The Colour of Magic and The Light Fantastic shows him with four eyes. He also wears dentures, a concept that inspires Cohen the Barbarian to have a set made for himself made out of trolls' teeth, which are made of diamond.

His adventures begin in The Colour of Magic, when he decides to visit the city of Ankh-Morpork, where he meets the inept wizard Rincewind whom he hires as a guide. Throughout the first two novels, he is followed by the Luggage, a homicidally vicious travel chest which moves on hundreds of little legs, carrying his belongings.

Twoflower is the optimistic but naive tourist. He often runs into danger, being certain that nothing bad will happen to him since he is not involved. He also believes in the fundamental goodness of human nature and that all problems can be resolved, if all parties show good will and cooperate. Rincewind, of course, remains immovably convinced that Twoflower's IQ is comparable to that of a pigeon. He has no understanding of the Agatean/Ankh-Morpork exchange rate and often overpays, primarily because even the smallest denomination of Agatean coin is made of pure gold, and, thus, often pays for small items and minor services with enough wealth to buy a sizable fraction of the city. However, he introduces the concept of insurance to Ankh-Morpork (in particular to the landlord of the Broken Drum, which would prove fortunate as the city and tavern were both consumed by flame (albeit not entirely by accident)—the policy allowed the Broken Drum to be rebuilt as the Mended Drum.)

Twoflower also has a rich imagination as he is able to summon a dragon through his mind. The dragon, which he calls "Ninereeds" after his unimaginative master when he was apprenticed as a clerk, is very obedient to him. With the help of Ninereeds he rescues Rincewind and escapes the Wyrmberg.

The book relating his journey across the Discworld is considered a revolutionary pamphlet in his native land as it is traditionally believed (and officially decreed) that the world outside of the Empire is a hellish wasteland populated by "bloodsucking vampire ghosts", resulting in him being imprisoned in the Forbidden City. It is revealed that he is a father and a widower; his wife died after tax collectors attacked Bes Pelargic, with his recollections of the event being the only times he has displayed anger. He attempts to avenge her by challenging the Grand Vizier Lord Hong to a duel.  At the end of the novel Interesting Times he was promoted to the rank of Grand Vizier of the Empire, under Emperor Cohen. It is not known if he still holds the position following Cohen's disappearance (as told in The Last Hero) but the Discworld Atlas states that the Agatean Empire has, in that time, become the 'People's Beneficial Republic of Agatea', headed by a Chairman.

He appears in the books The Colour of Magic, The Light Fantastic and Interesting Times and in the computer game NetHack as the quest leader for the tourist class. He is played by Sean Astin (alongside David Jason as Rincewind) in the two-part television adaptation.

Verence II of Lancre
King Verence II of Lancre first appears in the sixth novel of the series, Wyrd Sisters, as the court jester of the monarch of Lancre, Duke Felmet. He was previously the Fool to King Verence I, as his father and grandfather were before him. Over the course of the book, the Fool meets and falls in love with Magrat Garlick and stands up to the Duke, admitting he saw the murder of Verence I. At the end of the book Verence I's hidden heir, Tomjon, rejects the throne. Nanny Ogg then tells everyone that the Fool is Tomjon's older half-brother. It is assumed that this means he is the son of the elder Fool's wife and Verence I, and he is duly crowned Verence II. However, given how well the Queen got on with the elder Fool, there is another interpretation.

In Lords and Ladies Verence and Magrat finally marry. Verence had gone through much of the story subtly trying to deal with a major problem, namely that he was not quite sure how to actually consummate the marriage. He ordered a book on the subject ("The one with the woodcuts,") from Ankh-Morpork, only to discover (in what would have otherwise been a horribly embarrassing scene) that he'd been mistakenly sent a book on MARTIAL Arts instead (he quickly recovers from the shock and presents the book to Shawn Ogg, the castle's only guard, as if that had been his intention all along). Near the end, he consults with Casanunda, a 'ladies man' dwarf that had assisted in the defense of the kingdom. In Carpe Jugulum they have a daughter; Princess Esmerelda Margaret Note Spelling of Lancre.

Verence II is a very well-meaning king, who takes running a kingdom very seriously (he takes most things seriously, having learnt at a very early age that being a Fool was no laughing matter), but things seldom turn out the way he might want. The most noticeable results of his attempts at modernising the kingdom have been a Parliament that no-one attends and an invasion of vampires due to a diplomatic gaffe. It has been suggested that while his subjects appreciate his attempts to make life better, they would really prefer a king who orders them around and carouses a lot because they would know their place under such rule.

Verence was voiced by Andrew Branch in the BBC Radio 4 adaptation of Wyrd Sisters, and by Les Dennis in the Cosgrove Hall animation.

Victor Tugelbend
Student wizard turned actor, and protagonist of Moving Pictures. Victor's uncle left a legacy to pay for Victor's tuition at Unseen University, provided that Victor never scored below an 80 on an exam. Victor, however, decided that being a student wizard was greatly preferable to being a wizard, because as a student he could live a relatively safe and comfortable lifestyle while as a wizard he would face the risk of assassinations by students wishing to advance. Therefore, Victor studied extremely hard and, when finals came around each year, carefully and competently scored an 84; four points above the minimum to continue receiving the legacy, but four points below the passing grade of 88 (On one occasion he actually passed by accident, but appealed against it on the grounds that he felt he'd failed to pay adequate attention to some details and he would not feel right to pass over the more eligible candidates; he subsequently only received an 82 and an 83 in the later exams as he was trying to be careful). Eventually this caught the attention of the Bursar, who arranged for Victor to receive a special test consisting of only one question: "What is your name?" By this time, however, Victor had left Unseen University to become an actor in Holy Wood, under the stage name Victor Maraschino, and the test paper in question was, instead, received by accident by Ponder Stibbons. He films several movies with Ginger Withel (aka Delores De Syn), and eventually uses the magic of Holy Wood to defeat the Things from the Dungeon Dimensions with Ginger's help. Victor has not reappeared in any subsequent Discworld books.

Victor is also notable for being actively lazy; he kept himself fit because it was less effort to do things with decent muscles, and put a lot of work into avoiding work (as his University career illustrates). He was looking for a job that was romantic, but did not involve hard work, which Holy Wood provided. In "Moving Pictures", a summary given about him is a reference to Fred Astaire.

Vorbis
The antagonist of Small Gods, Vorbis was the Head of the Omnian Quisition, holding the positions of Exquisitor and Subdeacon, the latter being the highest rank that could be held by an Exquisitor to prevent the institution from becoming "too big for its boots." He believed that he was destined to become the Cenobiarch and Eighth Prophet of Omnianism, as the Great God Om had told him. However, this was merely the echoes of his own voice bouncing inside his own head, the Great God Om having become so weak from a lack of belief (in no small part because of the efforts of the Quisition) that only the truly faithful novice Brutha could hear him. For the glory of Om, Vorbis intended to wage a bloody holy war against the continent of Klatch, having orchestrated the short-lived conquest and annexation of Ephebe by facilitating the death of the missionary Brother Murduck to provide a casus belli and organising a costly strategy of leaving caches of water in the desert to allow the Omnian Divine Legion to invade Ephebe from the desert. Vorbis justifies his actions as being guided by "fundamental truth", i.e., that Brother Murduck had been killed by the Ephebeans because of their unwillingness to convert to Omnianism, and is unmovably certain of Omnian dogma, such as the belief that the Discworld is a perfect sphere and that steam-powered machines cannot exist as they do not possess minds or muscles.

After pursuing an escaping party made up of Brutha, Om, Sergeant Simony, the philosopher Didactylos and his apprentice and nephew Urn and being caught in a storm, Vorbis is found  by Brutha and Om washed up on the desert coast and in a catatonic state. Bruth carries Vorbis through the desert back to Omnia so that everyone can learn about what he did, despite Om saying that he is a burden or that he does not deserve being saved. However, when the party is within sight of the citadel, Vorbis knocks out Brutha and abducts him, returning to the Citadel to be ordained as the Eighth Prophet, where he informs everyone that he led Brutha through the desert; when questioned by Brutha, Vorbis offers the "fundamentally true" reasoning that he had led Brutha through a "desert of the soul". Having commissioned a heatable iron turtle intended to punish those who question the shape of the world, Vorbis sentenced Brutha to be tortured upon it for disrupting his ordainment and not striking him; in a private conversation, Vorbis reveals to Brutha that he may not, in fact, truly believe in Om, saying that the Church and its empire were achieved by men rather than Om. To save Brutha, Om kills Vorbis by dropping from an eagle's claws onto his head (a reference to the apocryphal death of the Ancient Greek playwright Aeschylus). In the ethereal desert, Vorbis learns to his horror that what he thought was the voice of Om was in fact his own voice echoing inside of his own head, plunging him into despair. His body is presented by Brutha to the generals of an invading anti-Omnian alliance in order to prevent a bloody war, although this is unsuccessful, with Didactylos saying that "it takes a long time for people like Vorbis to die" due to the impact they leave upon the world. When Brutha, Eighth Prophet and Prophet of Prophets, dies after a hundred years in power, he encounters a catatonic Vorbis in the ethereal desert; taking pity on him, he guides him through the desert to face judgement.

Wallace Sonky
An Ankh-Morpork tradesman, owner of Sonky's Rubber Goods, and maker of Sonky's Preventatives. His "sonkies" (condoms), as they are generally known, sell for a penny a packet. Samuel Vimes considered him a saint as, without Sonky, the housing problems in Ankh-Morpork, as well as its population of idiots and criminals would be even more pressing.

He was killed in The Fifth Elephant, after having helped produce the replica of the Scone of Stone. He is known to have had a brother in Überwald.  He is present briefly in Night Watch.

Walter Plinge
Walter is an odd-job man at the Ankh-Morpork Opera House. Plinge is an awkward, nervy figure in a beret, whose alter-ego is the Opera Ghost. Walter is helped by Agnes Nitt into combining both aspects of his personality together so that he can become the director of music. Walter writes popular operas "with tunes you can hum". Walter might resemble Frank Spencer known from the BBC television comedy Some Mothers Do 'Ave 'Em. Spencer was played by Michael Crawford, who was also the original performer of the eponymous character in Phantom of the Opera.

 William de Worde 
A professional scribe who in The Truth has a career of writing down interesting news for various Lords and Ladies abroad, this led to him  becoming the editor of the Disc's first newspaper, The Ankh-Morpork Times. He has an obsessive dislike of lying, which he has however learned to work around in the name of journalism. In self-imposed exile from his background of wealthy nobility, especially his father Lord de Worde, William works hard (and with varying degrees of success) to cast off the influence of his father, Lord de Worde, an arrogant speciesist, 
and bully, who goes so far as to leave the city and live in the countryside to avoid contact with these "lesser races".
It has been suggested that by Going Postal he may have married his friend and editor, Sacharissa Cripslock.

William also appears in Monstrous Regiment, as a war correspondent in Borogravia along with Otto von Chriek, and is mentioned in Thud!, Making Money, Unseen Academicals, and Snuff. According to Moist von Lipwig he is roughly the same age as Moist, who is 26 in Going Postal.

Willie Hobson
An Ankh-Morpork businessman who runs Hobson's Livery Stable, a multi-storey construction which sells and hires horses, as well as stabling other people's horses. For some reason it is a popular location for circumspect meetings. According to rumour, Hobson employs an Igor with a talent for taking body parts of different horses, and stitching them together into a "new" animal (see chop shop).  Moist von Lipwig refers to a rumour that there is a horse in Ankh-Morpork with a longitudinal seam from head to tail.  These rumours are rarely uttered in the presence of Hobson, who is a large man with a direct sense of humour when it comes to putting people with smart mouths on unbroken horses. He appears in Going Postal, although the stable had previously appeared in The Truth.  His name is a reference to the real stable-owner Thomas Hobson, best known as the name behind the expression Hobson's choice. Hobson is a large man, described as looking similar to the result of shaving a bear.

Lady Ysabell, Duchess of Sto HelitYsabell is the adopted daughter of Death, who saved her as a baby when her parents were killed in the Great Nef desert (no explanation has been given as to why he did this; Ysabell said that "He didn't feel sorry for me, he never feels anything... He probably thought sorry for me."). When first encountered she is a sixteen-year-old girl with silver hair and silver eyes who, it transpires, has been sixteen for thirty-five Discworld 'years' (no time passes in Death's Domain). During her encounter with Rincewind (see below), her behaviour is sufficiently flamboyant as to cause him to believe she is "bonkers". When Mort first encountered Ysabell, he was given the impression of "too many chocolates". She also has a fixation for the colour pink.

Ysabell first appeared in The Light Fantastic, where she met Rincewind, and was surprised to learn that he was not actually dead. This state of affairs might not have continued long if the Luggage had not intervened. During the events of Mort it became clear that Ysabell was competent in carrying out the work of her father including The Duty''' and 'doing the nodes'. This mainly involves figuring out which deaths needed to be attended to personally, an important aspect of all reality. Before Mort arrived she shared her home with Albert, Death's manservant.

In 2004 BBC Radio 4 adapted Mort'', with the title character voiced by Carl Prekopp and Ysabell being voiced by Clare Corbett.

References

External links
 Discworld & Pratchett Wiki

 
Discworld